Zamparelli is an Italian surname. Notable people with the surname include:

Dino Zamparelli (born 1992), British racing driver
Elsa Zamparelli (born 1944), American costume designer
Mario Armond Zamparelli (c. 1921 – 2012), American artist
Miriam Zamparelli (born 1941), Puerto Rican sculptor

Italian-language surnames